Katharine Williams is a former Trials Division justice at the Supreme Court of Victoria. She was appointed to the bench 28 October 2002 and left 12 February 2015. Williams attended law school at Melbourne University, taking law classes as early as age 16.

References

Judges of the Supreme Court of Victoria
Australian women judges
Living people
Year of birth missing (living people)